Enskede may refer to

Enskede (locality), a locality in Stockholm, Sweden
Enskede-Årsta (1998–2007), merged into the borough below
Enskede-Årsta-Vantör (formed 2007), a borough in Stockholm, Sweden
Gamla Enskede, a district in the borough above
Enskede gård, a district in the borough above
Enskededalen, a district in Skarpnäck borough, Stockholm, Sweden

Sports
 Enskede IK, football team in Gamla Eskede

See also
South Stockholm
Enschede, a city in the eastern Netherlands